Televisión Regional del Oriente (Eastern Regional Television, TRO) is a Colombian regional public television network, created in 1997. Its signal reaches Santander and Norte de Santander and broadcasts from Bucaramanga and Cúcuta.

Most of TRO's programming is educational and cultural.

References

External links
Official site

Television stations in Colombia
Television networks in Colombia
Spanish-language television stations
Television channels and stations established in 1997
Mass media in Cúcuta
Mass media in Bucaramanga